Wilhelm Ellis Rau Palace (Polish: Pałacyk Wilhelma Ellisa Raua) - a historical building, located by Ujazdów Avenue in Warsaw, Poland.

The palace was built between 1866 and 1868 under architect Leandro Marconi's designs. In the nineteen-twenties of the Polish interwar period the palace was rented by the Ministry of Foreign Affairs, serving the function of vice-minister Jan Szembek's residence. The villa burned down in 1944. After World War II, the building was rebuilt between 1948 and 1949, under Polish and Swiss architects, Szymon Syrkus and Hans Schmidt respectably.

The palaces houses the Embassy of Switzerland and the Swiss promotional non-profit organisation for Swiss exports, Osec. Next to the building is the location of the Embassy of the United States of America.

References

Palaces in Warsaw